Aliabad (also Romanized as `Alīābād) is a village in Bardesareh Rural District, Oshtorinan District, Borujerd County, Lorestan Province, Iran. At the 2006 census, its population was 21, in 5 families.

References 

Towns and villages in Borujerd County